Psalm 109 is a psalm in the Book of Psalms. In the slightly different numbering system used in the Greek Septuagint version of the Bible and in the Latin Vulgate, this psalm is Psalm 108. It is attributed to King David and noted for containing some of the most severe curses in the Bible, such as verses 12 and 13. It has traditionally been called the "Judas Psalm" or "Iscariot Psalm" for an interpretation relating verse 8 to Judas Iscariot's punishment as noted in the New Testament.

The psalm's Latin title is Deus, laudem, from its opening words, Deus, laudem meam ne tacueris ("My God, whom I praise, do not remain silent" in the New International Version).

Analysis
The New Oxford Annotated Bible titles this psalm "Prayer for deliverance from enemies", as one of the Imprecatory Psalms against deceitful foes. It starts with the psalmist's plea in verses 1–5, followed by an extensive imprecation (verses 6–19, concluded or summed up in verse 20). The renewed pleading at verse 21 is made with appeals on the grounds of Yahweh's steadfast love, the details of the psalmist's own misery, and the request for vengeance to the enemies, but the lament ends with the vow to offer praise, which is common in this type of psalm (verses 30–31). In verses 8–14 the curse by the psalmist 'extends through three generations': on the person (verse 8), on the person's children (verses 9–13), and on the person's parents (verse 14). The change from plural enemies (verses 2–5) to a singular individual (verses 6–19) parallels Psalm 55.  

In verse 4, there is evil given 'in return for my love'. The curses here are consistent with Proverbs 17:13, where "if evil is given for good then evil will not depart from their house". Returning evil for good is also seen in other psalms, often seen as portending Judas being an 'anti-friend' figure returning evil for good or even friendship, namely 41, 69 and here in 109.

Verses 2 and 30
There is an inclusio near the opening and closing of the Psalm: in the opening, the Psalmist is facing the lies of accusers mouths while in the close his own mouth greatly praises God.
For the mouth of the wicked and the mouth of the deceitful are opened against me: they have spoken against me with a lying tongue.

I will greatly praise the Lord with my mouth; yea, I will praise him among the multitude.

Verse 8
Let his days be few; and let another take his office.
The Apostle Peter quoted verse 8 ("Let another take his office") before the apostles elected the replacement for Judas Iscariot in Acts , appointing Matthias in his place.

Verse 12
Let there be none to extend mercy unto him: neither let there be any to favour his fatherless children.
"Let there be none to extend mercy unto him" or "Let him have none to continue lovingkindness to him as represented in his children"; nor "anyone have pity" on his orphaned children.

Verse 13
Let his posterity be cut off; and in the generation following let their name be blotted out.
"Let his posterity be cut off": or "may his sons die childless" (cf. ,).
"In the generation following their name be blotted out": or "in the next generation their name be removed from the registry of the citizens" (cf. ). The extinction of a family (name) was considered the most extreme calamity for the Israelites.

Verse 31
For He shall stand at the right hand of the poor,To save him from those who condemn him.The close of the psalm has God at the right hand of the poor man, in striking contrast with the opening of Psalm 110, where God calls a man to sit at his right hand, made forever like the priest king, Melchizedek.

Uses
In Judaism
Psalm 109 is recited on the day of Parshat Zachor.

In political contexts
In the United States, verse 8, "May his days be few; may another take his place of leadership", has been used by a number of fundamentalist preachers who use the imprecatory psalm as an imprecatory prayer. Pastor Greg Dixon of the Indianapolis Baptist Temple had invoked it, which had been condemned by others. In 2009, the media reported more widely on its usage in reference to President Barack Obama, by those such as Pastor Wiley Drake. In January 2010, a Florida Sheriff's deputy was suspended for highlighting the passage in another deputy's bible and adding the note "The Obama Prayer" beside it. In January 2012, Kansas Speaker of the House Michael O'Neal sent an email quoting verse 8 to his Republican colleagues that stated, "At last – I can honestly voice a Biblical prayer for our president! Look it up – it is word for word! Let us all bow our heads and pray. Brothers and Sisters, can I get an AMEN? AMEN!!!!!!" On June 10, 2016, Georgia Senator David Perdue quoted the verse, referencing Obama, at the Faith and Freedom Coalition's Road to Majority conference.

By the late summer of 2017, bumper stickers could be seen asking people to pray for US President Donald Trump with the same attribution.

In modern literature
Psalm 109 was used by Thomas Hardy in his novel The Mayor of Casterbridge''. Michael Henchard, the protagonist of the novel, is drinking with the choir after practice when he sees his rival, Donald Farfrae, whom he hates. He later persuades the choir to sing Psalm 109. The choir master remarks of this psalm that, "Twasn't made for singing. We chose it once when the gypsy stole the parson's mare, thinking to please him, but parson were quite upset. Whatever Servant David were thinking about when he made a Psalm that nobody can sing without disgracing himself, I can't fathom."

Some verses of the same psalm figure prominently in M. R. James's supernatural story "The Stalls of Barchester Cathedral" (1910), which recounts the guilt-ridden life and dismal death of Archdeacon John Haynes.

In Anglicanism
According to the 1662 Book of Common Prayer Psalms 108 and 109 are said or sung at Evensong on the 22nd day of every month.

See also
Acts 1

References

Sources

External links

 

109
Works attributed to David